Damon Bailey (born October 21, 1971) is an American former professional basketball player. He rose to national prominence after being recruited by Indiana coach Bob Knight as an 8th grader, an unusual move at the time. Bailey went on to become Indiana's all-time high school leading scorer and would earn All-America honors playing for the Indiana Hoosiers. He became a cult figure during the late 1980s and early 1990s in Indiana.  Bailey was an assistant coach of the Butler University's women's basketball team from 2014 to 2017.

Prep career 

In early 1986, when Bailey was a 14-year-old eighth-grader, Indiana coach Bob Knight watched two games featuring Bailey's team. At the time, Knight and his 1985–86 team were being covered by author John Feinstein for his book A Season on the Brink, which would later go on to be a national best-seller. After taking in the game, Knight remarked to his assistant coaches that "Damon Bailey is better than any guard we have right now. I don't mean potentially better, I mean better today." Due to the national and statewide popularity of Feinstein's book, Bailey's legend took off.

Later that year, as Bailey was entering Bedford North Lawrence High School (BNL) and Feinstein's book was being published, the acclaimed basketball movie Hoosiers was released. Comparisons between the movie and Bailey's career were frequently made. He told Sports Illustrated, "BNL had a lot in common with Hickory. Not because we're a small school. We're one of the biggest in the state. But we had nobody over 6'3", and no one thought we could win it."

In November 1986, as his freshman year of high school was beginning, Sports Illustrated tabbed him the country's best ninth-grade hoopster. That freshman year he led BNL to the state Final Four, averaging over 23 points a game in the process. His team's tournament run ended to two-time defending champion Marion in the semifinals. Bailey scored 20 points in that game and BNL trailed 47–46 after three quarters, but he fouled out with 2:06 to go and the opposing team – led by Lyndon Jones and Jay Edwards – prevailed 70–61 en route to their third straight state title. Bailey was named First Team Indiana All-State that year, and every other year of his high school career.

The next season, with Bailey as a sophomore, BNL again qualified for the final four, this time facing Muncie Central. Bailey totaled 25 points, 10 rebounds and four assists, but it was not enough as Muncie Central went on to post a 60–53 victory.

As a senior Bailey led his team to the 1990 Indiana state championship. Their opponent, Concord High School, was undefeated and led by future University of Nebraska standout Jamar Johnson.  Before a crowd of more than 41,000 people at the Hoosier Dome in Indianapolis – the most people to ever attend a high school basketball game – Bailey scored 30 points, including his team's final 11, in a 63–60 come-from-behind win. Bailey told Sports Illustrated, "The greatest thrill in winning was proving to people that we could. We didn't walk out on the floor and scare anybody. We just had a lot of heart."

Bailey finished his high school career having appeared in three state Final Fours and scoring a record 3,134 points, a record that still stands today.  He played in 110 varsity games and reached double figures in all of them, including a career high of 51 against Jeffersonville as a sophomore. He averaged 28.4 points per game over his four years. Bailey was named Indiana Mr. Basketball, earned McDonald's All-American honors, and was tabbed the 1990 consensus National Player of the Year. Bailey elected to play college basketball for Bob Knight's Indiana Hoosiers. After winning the state championship, Bailey told reporters, "Now, I'm his boy."

College career 

Bailey was a four-year starter for Bob Knight and the Indiana Hoosiers from 1990–1994. In Bailey's first three seasons (1990–93), he and the Hoosiers posted 87 victories, the most by any Big Ten team in a three-year span, breaking the mark of 86 set by Knight's Indiana teams of 1974–76. Teams from these three seasons spent all but two of the 53 poll weeks in the top 10, and 38 of them in the top 5. They captured two Big Ten crowns in 1990–91 and 1992–93, and during the 1991–92 season reached the Final Four. During the 1992–93 season, the 31–4 Hoosiers finished the season at the top of the AP Poll, but were defeated by Kansas in the Elite Eight.

Teammates from this era included Greg Graham, Pat Graham, All-American Alan Henderson, and 1993 National Player of the Year Calbert Cheaney. With such talented teammates around him, Bailey largely served as a role player, averaging 11.3 points per game his first three years. Nevertheless, Indiana's athletic offices got more requests for paraphernalia and autographs for Bailey than any of the team's other stars, including Cheaney.

In his senior season, 1993–94, with many of the team's previous stars having graduated, Bailey served as the team's leader. In a game on December 4, 1993 in the Indiana–Kentucky rivalry, UK was ranked number one in the nation, but Indiana upset the Wildcats.  Bailey hit 16-of-19 free throws (record for a single game) to score 29 points. Bailey's performance in the upset earned him a spot on the cover of Sports Illustrated, which has since become an iconic image among Indiana fans. The Hoosiers finished the season 21–9 overall, 12-6 in the Big Ten (3rd), and advanced to the NCAA Sweet 16.

Bailey finished sixth on Indiana's all-time scoring list with 1,741 points. He averaged 13.2 points, 3.5 rebounds and 3.6 assists per game for his career. He also garnered a third-team All-American award and a first-team All-Big Ten award.

College statistics

|-
| style="text-align:left;"| 1990–91
| style="text-align:left;"| Indiana
| 33 || 14 || 26.0 || .506 || .434 || .692 || 2.9 || 2.9 || 1.2 || .3 || 11.4
|-
| style="text-align:left;"| 1991–92
| style="text-align:left;"| Indiana
| 34 || 27 || 27.1 || .497 || .471 || .765 || 3.6 || 3.1 || .8 || .0 || 12.4
|-
| style="text-align:left;"| 1992–93
| style="text-align:left;"| Indiana
| 35 || 24 || 27.2 || .459 || .418 || .728 || 3.3 || 4.1 || .6 || .2 || 10.1
|-
| style="text-align:left;"| 1993–94
| style="text-align:left;"| Indiana
| 30 || 30 || 33.9 || .481 || .423 || .802 || 4.3 || 4.3 || 1.5|| .2 || 19.6
|- class="sortbottom"
| style="text-align:center;" colspan="2"| Career
| 132 || 95 || 28.2 || .485 || .437 || .754 || 3.5 || 3.6 || 1.0 || .2 || 13.2

Professional basketball career 

Bailey was selected with the 44th overall pick in the 1994 NBA Draft by his hometown team, the Indiana Pacers. Bailey was cut after one season of being on the team's injured list, and a series of pre-season games the following year. Briefly in January 1999 he signed with the Cleveland Cavaliers, but was soon let go.  Bailey never played in an NBA regular-season game.

Bailey played in the Continental Basketball Association (CBA) with the Fort Wayne Fury. He was selected to the All-CBA First Team in 1998, while ranking third in the league with 7.3 assists per game, and to the Second Team in 1999. He was named American Conference Player of the Week three times in his CBA career. On November 1, 2003, Bailey  retired from professional basketball.

Life after pro basketball 
He was later employed as the boys' basketball coach for his alma mater, Bedford North Lawrence High School. The team finished 11–10 in Bailey's first coaching year. The Times-Mail in Bedford, Indiana reported on March 1, 2007 that Bailey had resigned as coach of BNL after two seasons, he finished with a 23–19 overall record. Bailey is the co-owner of Hawkins-Bailey Warehouse in Bedford, Indiana.

Bailey was the assistant coach of the BNL Lady Stars basketball team for four seasons, including the 2012–2013 Indiana high school state basketball championship winning team. Bailey was named the head coach of the Lady Stars in May 2013, replacing Kurt Godlevske, who left to be an assistant coach for the Butler Bulldogs women's basketball team. As the head coach in the 2013–2014 season, Bailey led the Lady Stars to their second consecutive state title. In May 2014, Godlevske was promoted to head coach for Butler's women's team, and Bailey again joined him as an assistant at Butler.

In April 2017, Bailey resigned as the Butler Bulldogs women's basketball assistant coach after three seasons. Bailey stated that he was leaving coaching to focus on Hawkins Bailey Warehouse distribution company, a business in Bedford, Indiana, which he is a co-owner.

References

Further reading
.

1971 births
Living people
All-American college men's basketball players
American expatriate basketball people in France
American men's basketball players
Basketball coaches from Indiana
Basketball players at the 1999 Pan American Games
Basketball players from Indiana
Butler Bulldogs women's basketball coaches
Élan Béarnais players
Fort Wayne Fury players
High school basketball coaches in Indiana
Indiana Hoosiers men's basketball players
Indiana Pacers draft picks
McDonald's High School All-Americans
Pan American Games medalists in basketball
Pan American Games silver medalists for the United States
Parade High School All-Americans (boys' basketball)
People from Bedford, Indiana
Point guards
Bedford North Lawrence High School alumni
Medalists at the 1999 Pan American Games